Newport Center or Newport Centre may refer to:

 Newport Center, Newport Beach, California, a business district
 Newport Center, Vermont, a census-designated place in the town of Newport
 Newport Centre (shopping mall), in Jersey City, New Jersey
 Newport Centre (Wales), a leisure centre